Hickory Creek is a stream  in southern Benton County, Arkansas in the United States. It is a tributary of the White River within Beaver Lake.

The stream headwaters arise in southern Benton County and northern Washington County in northwest Arkansas northeast of Springdale. The stream flows to the northeast and enters Beaver Lake south of the Hickory Creek Campground and southwest of the community of Pleasure Heights.

References

Rivers of Benton County, Arkansas
Tributaries of the White River (Arkansas–Missouri)